Jon Rudkin  (born 13 January 1968) is an English football coach currently working for Leicester City and Oud-Heverlee Leuven as its Director of Football, alongside his role as Academy Director.

Leicester City

Youth roles
Rudkin was appointed the Academy Manager at Leicester City in June 2003 having previously been a schoolboy in the City youth system himself when he was 16 and working as a youth coach since 1998. After working as a coach on a part-time basis Rudkin took up the full-time post of Head Coach at the then centre of excellence. During that period Leicester produced a number of outstanding talents which have progressed from the Academy to the first team – including Emile Heskey and Matt Piper.

Rudkin holds the UEFA Pro licence and has completed the Academy Director's licence. On 29 August 2007, he jointly took over managerial responsibility of Leicester after Martin Allen left by mutual consent.

Rudkin has since overseen the development of players through the Leicester City youth academy such as Andy King, Joe Mattock, Richard Stearman, Jeffrey Schlupp and Liam Moore. All five having gained international recognition in the form of either a full international cap or an Under-21 international cap.

Director of Football
On 14 December 2014, Rudkin replaced the outgoing Terry Robinson as director of football.

On 2016, Rudkin served as director of the Oud-Heverlee Leuven under the King Power International Group

Managerial statistics

References

External links
 Profile on LCFC.com

1965 births
Living people
English football managers
Leicester City F.C. managers
English Football League managers
Leicester City F.C. non-playing staff